was a professional wrestling event promoted by DDT Pro-Wrestling (DDT). It took place on March 25, 2018, in Tokyo, Japan, at the Ryōgoku Kokugikan. It was the twenty-second event under the Judgement name. The event aired domestically on Fighting TV Samurai and globally on DDT's video-on-demand service DDT Universe.

Storylines
Judgement 2018 featured twelve professional wrestling matches that involved different wrestlers from pre-existing scripted feuds and storylines. Wrestlers portrayed villains, heroes, or less distinguishable characters in the scripted events that built tension and culminated in a wrestling match or series of matches.

By winning the D-Oh Grand Prix 2018 tournament on January 28, Shuji Ishikawa earned a KO-D Openweight Championship match in the main event against Konosuke Takeshita.

Event
The third match on the undercard was presented by Tokyo Joshi Pro Wrestling, a sub-brand of DDT.

Next, the gauntlet match saw the participation of Deadlift Lolita (Ladybeard and Reika Saiki) and LiLiCo, a TV personality.

The next match was a singles match between Colt Cabana (billed as Colt "Boom Boom" Cabana) and Joey Ryan dubbed "World Crazy Wrestler No. 1 Decision Battle In DDT".

Next was a second match presented by Tokyo Joshi Pro Wrestling, featuring Yoshiko from SEAdLINNNG.

Next, Super Sasadango Machine defended the Ironman Heavymetalweight Championship against Jiro "Ikemen" Kuroshio from Wrestle-1.

The five-way tag team match was a "Losers Get Anal Blast Weapon Rumble" in which various weapons secretly chosen by the participants beforehand were being introduced one after an other at regular intervals.

Next was a six-man tag team match that saw the participation of the Great Muta from Wrestle-1.

Results

Gauntlet match

References

External links
The official DDT Pro-Wrestling website

2018
2018 in professional wrestling
Professional wrestling in Tokyo
Professional wrestling anniversary shows